Miette Hill is located on the border of Alberta and British Columbia. It was named for Bonhomme Miette, a figure in French Canadian folklore.

See also
 List of peaks on the Alberta–British Columbia border
 Mountains of Alberta
 Mountains of British Columbia

References

Miette Hill
Miette Hill
Canadian Rockies